Asbotos was a town in ancient Thessaly. It is unlocated. It may have been a polis (city-state) in the 4th and 3rd centuries BCE.

References

Populated places in ancient Thessaly
Former populated places in Greece
Lost ancient cities and towns